Eric David Reed (born December 7, 1983) is an American soccer player.

Career

College and Amateur
Reed grew up in Laguna Hills, California, and attended Laguna Hills High School, where he was a four-year starter. During this time, he received a handful of United States U-18 caps. After high school, he attended UCLA where he redshirted his freshman year. The following year he appeared in four games and continued his good form earning an additional 16 games in his second year. He was a consistent first team starter over the next two years.

While attending college, he competed in the USL Premier Development League with the Southern California Seahorses. Reed was the 2006 PDL Goalkeeper of the Year, leading the league with a 0.62 goals against average as well as the top shutout total with 10.

Professional
After he was not selected in the 2007 MLS Superdraft, Reed was selected by the California Victory of the USL First Division in the 2007 USL First Division College Player Draft. At the end of the 2007 USL-1 season, California Victory fans voted Reed as team MVP.

Following the demise of the Victory, Reed transferred to USL Second Division outfit Cleveland City Stars, who he helped win the USL2 title in 2008. On February 9, 2008, Reed joined Carolina RailHawks for the 2009 season.

Reed signed with Charlotte Eagles of the USL Pro league on February 22, 2011.

Reed signed with Syracuse Silver Knights of the Major Indoor Soccer League for the 2011-12 indoor season on October 25, 2011.

Coaching
Reed was briefly employed as the Men's Goalkeeping Coach at the University of San Francisco while playing for California Victory in 2007.  He served as the Men's goalkeeper coach for Davidson College for two seasons in 2012-2013. He served as the Assistant Men's Soccer Coach of Bowling Green State University Men's Soccer Team from 2014-2017.  This was followed by a Head Coaching role at Malone University in Canton, Ohio.  He now currently works as the assistant men's soccer coach at UCLA.

Personal
Eric is married with three children and currently lives in Los Angeles, CA.

References

https://uclabruins.com/staff.aspx?staff=5799

External links
 Carolina RailHawks bio

1983 births
Living people
American soccer players
Soccer players from New Hampshire
California Victory players
North Carolina FC players
Charlotte Eagles players
Cleveland City Stars players
Association football goalkeepers
Southern California Seahorses players
Syracuse Silver Knights players
UCLA Bruins men's soccer players
USL First Division players
USL League Two players
USL Second Division players
USSF Division 2 Professional League players
USL Championship players
United States men's youth international soccer players
Soccer players from California
Sportspeople from Orange County, California
People from Laguna Hills, California
San Francisco Dons men's soccer coaches
Davidson Wildcats men's soccer coaches
Bowling Green Falcons men's soccer coaches
UCLA Bruins men's soccer coaches
American soccer coaches